The Dutch Eerste Divisie in the 1958–59 season was contested by 31 teams, divided in one group of sixteen teams and one of fifteen. One team less participated this year, due to the merger of DWS with eredivisie-club BVC Amsterdam. FC Volendam and Sittardia won the championship.

New entrants and group changes

Eerste Divisie A
Promoted from the 1957–58 Tweede Divisie:
 ZFC
Relegated from the 1957–58 Eredivisie:
 BVV
Entered from the B-group:
 FC Eindhoven
 Fortuna Vlaardingen
 HFC Haarlem
 Leeuwarden
 Limburgia &
 FC Wageningen

Eerste Divisie B
Promoted from the 1957–58 Tweede Divisie:
 Heracles
Relegated from the 1957–58 Eredivisie:
 GVAV
Entered from the A-group:
 Excelsior
 HVC
 RBC Roosendaal
 Roda Sport &
 Vitesse Arnhem

Final tables

Eerste Divisie A

Eerste Divisie B

See also
 1958–59 Eredivisie
 1958–59 Tweede Divisie

References
Netherlands - List of final tables (RSSSF)

Eerste Divisie seasons
2
Neth